is a 2018 adult stop-motion animated science-fiction drama film written, produced, and directed by Wes Anderson and featuring an ensemble cast of Bryan Cranston, Koyu Rankin, Edward Norton, Liev Schreiber, Bill Murray, Bob Balaban, Jeff Goldblum, Scarlett Johansson, Kunichi Nomura, Tilda Swinton, Ken Watanabe, Akira Ito, Greta Gerwig, Akira Takayama, Frances McDormand, F. Murray Abraham, Courtney B. Vance, Yojiro Noda, Fisher Stevens, Mari Natsuki, Nijiro Murakami, Yoko Ono, Harvey Keitel, and Frank Wood. A U.S.–German co-production, Isle of Dogs was produced by Indian Paintbrush and Anderson's own production company, American Empirical Pictures, in association with Studio Babelsberg. The film is set in the fictional retro-futuristic Japanese city of Megasaki, where Mayor Kenji Kobayashi has banished all dogs to Trash Island due to a canine influenza pandemic. Kobayashi’s nephew Atari sets out to find his missing dog Spots with the help of a group of dogs led by stray dog Chief.

Anderson started developing the film in October 2015 using stop-motion animation, with a voice cast of Norton, Cranston, and Balaban. It draws inspiration from films by Akira Kurosawa and Hayao Miyazaki, as well as the stop-motion animated holiday specials made by Rankin/Bass Productions, the 1982 animated film The Plague Dogs, and Disney's 101 Dalmatians. Production began in October 2016 at the 3 Mills Studios in East London. By December 2016, Fox Searchlight Pictures acquired worldwide distribution rights to the film, scheduling it for a 2018 release.

Isle of Dogs opened the 68th Berlin International Film Festival, where Anderson was awarded the Silver Bear for Best Director. It was given a limited release in the United States on March 23, 2018 by Fox Searchlight Pictures, and went on wide release on April 13. It has grossed over $64 million worldwide, and received acclaim from critics, who praised its animation, story, musical score, and deadpan humor. A manga adaptation of the film by Minetarō Mochizuki was published in 2018, beginning with the May 24 issue of Weekly Morning. The film received nominations at the 76th Golden Globe Awards, 72nd British Academy Film Awards, and two nominations at the 91st Academy Awards, for Best Animated Feature Film and Best Original Score.

Plot
In this film, none of the Japanese dialogue spoken by human characters is translated in the movie except through an interpreter or occasional subtitles.

In 2038, an outbreak of canine flu spreads throughout Japan, including the fictitious city of Megasaki, with the risk of becoming contagious to humans. The city's authoritarian mayor, Kenji Kobayashi, ratifies an official decree banishing all dogs to Trash Island, which is immediately approved despite the insistence of Professor Watanabe, the mayor's political opponent, who states he is close to creating a cure. The first deported canine is a white and black-spotted dog named Spots Kobayashi, who served as the bodyguard dog of 12-year-old orphan Atari Kobayashi, the mayor's distant nephew and ward. 

Six months later, Atari hijacks a plane and flies it to Trash Island (now nicknamed "Isle of Dogs") to search for Spots. After crash-landing, Atari is rescued by a dog pack ostensibly led by an all-black canine named Chief, a lifelong stray. With their help, Atari first finds a locked cage that apparently contains Spots' skeleton, but learns that it is not him. They then fend off a rescue team sent by Mayor Kobayashi to retrieve Atari. Atari decides to continue his search for Spots, and the pack decides to help him. Chief initially declines but is then convinced by Nutmeg, a female ex-show dog, to help the boy out of obligation. The pack seeks advice from sage-like dogs Jupiter and Oracle, who surmise that Spots might be held captive by an isolated tribe of dogs rumored to be cannibals.

Meanwhile, Watanabe finally develops a successful serum and shows the results to Kobayashi, who only dismisses him. The professor objects, only to be put under house arrest and killed by a piece of poisoned sushi by order of the mayor's hatchet man, Major Domo. Tracy Walker, an American exchange student and member of a pro-dog activist group, suspects a conspiracy and begins to investigate. In the process of investigating, she gains feelings for Atari. Kobayashi and his political party are revealed to actually be responsible for the dog flu outbreak, seeking to eliminate the dogs after Kobayashi's cat-loving ancestors tried to do 1,000 years previously; they were foiled by a child samurai resembling Atari.

During their journey, Chief and Atari are separated from the others. Atari gives Chief a bath, revealing his white and black-spotted coat and thus his striking resemblance to Spots. The two bond and rejoin the rest of the pack, and are saved by Spots and the dog tribe from another rescue team. Spots confirms that he is Chief's older brother and that he was rescued by the tribe, who were test subjects from a secret lab that was abandoned after a tsunami. Spots became their leader and mated with a female tribe member named Peppermint, who is pregnant with their first litter. Because of these circumstances, Spots requests for Atari to transfer his protection duties to Chief. Chief is initially hesitant, but both he and Atari accept, and bodyguard duties are officially transferred to Chief. An owl later brings word that Kobayashi has rounded up all the exiled dogs and plans to exterminate them with poison gas.

Tracy confronts Watanabe's closest colleague Yoko Ono, who confirms Tracy's conspiracy theories and gives her the last vial of serum. At his re-election ceremony, Kobayashi prepares to give the extermination order when Tracy presents her evidence of his corruption. Kobayashi proceeds to deport Tracy, but before he can do so, Atari and the dogs arrive. They confirm the serum works by testing it on Chief and curing him. Atari addresses the crowd and recites a haiku he wrote and dedicated to Kobayashi, rekindling the sympathy that once existed between dogs and humans. Touched by Atari's words, Kobayashi officially rescinds the dog ban. Enraged, Major Domo yells at Mayor Kobayashi for breaking the Mayor's campaign promise and tries to kill Kobayashi and initiate the extermination himself, but thanks to Spots and the activists, Domo's plans are thwarted. Atari and Spots become gravely injured during the struggle and are taken to a hospital, where Kobayashi donates one of his kidneys to save his nephew. It is later revealed that while Kobayashi did win the election, he won't hold office because he was caught in a scandal. Therefore, all mayoral powers and authorities will transfer to his next-in-line, Atari.

One month later, Atari officially becomes the new mayor of Megasaki, and has all dogs reintegrated into society and cured of the dog flu, while Kobayashi and his propagandists and co-conspirators are sent to jail for political corruption, doing 30 days of community service, and paying fines of no less than ¥250,000 while Major Domo faces a possible death sentence. Tracy and Atari become a couple, while Chief and Nutmeg become their bodyguard dogs and begin a relationship. Meanwhile, Spots (recovering from his injuries) has had a statue erected in his honor and resumes raising his litter with Peppermint under the care of a priest at a Shinto temple.

Cast

Production

Development

In October 2015, Anderson, who had previously directed the animated film Fantastic Mr. Fox, announced he would be returning to the art form with "a film about dogs" starring Edward Norton, Bryan Cranston and Bob Balaban. Anderson has said that he was inspired by seeing a road sign for the Isle of Dogs in England while Fantastic Mr. Fox was in development. Anderson said that the film was strongly influenced by the films of Akira Kurosawa and Hayao Miyazaki, as well as the stop-motion animated holiday specials made by Rankin/Bass Productions, the 1982 animated film The Plague Dogs, and Disney's 101 Dalmatians.

Filming
Production began in October 2016 at the 3 Mills Studios in East London.

About 20,000 faces and 1,105 animatable puppets were crafted by "12 sculptors working six days a week" for the film; 2,000 more puppets were made for background characters. The detailed puppets of the main characters typically took 2–3 months to create. The animation department included a number of people who had worked on Fantastic Mr. Fox.

Virtual reality
Concurrently with the film, Félix and Paul Studios and FoxNext VR Studio collaborated on Isle of Dogs: Behind the Scenes (in Virtual Reality), an immersive video film that places the viewer directly inside the animated world. The virtual reality film was released on the Google Pixel platform.

Soundtrack

The film's score was composed by Alexandre Desplat, who had previously worked with Wes Anderson on Fantastic Mr. Fox (film), Moonrise Kingdom, and The Grand Budapest Hotel. The soundtrack also features various original and selected songs from a variety of musicians, mainly from Japan. Some songs had origins in classic Japanese cinema such as the Akira Kurosawa films Drunken Angel (1948) and Seven Samurai (1954). The soundtrack comprises 22 tracks in total, 15 of which were composed by Desplat.
Track listing
All tracks written and performed by Alexandre Desplat, except where noted.

Release
On December 23, 2016, Fox Searchlight Pictures acquired worldwide distribution rights to the film, with plans for a 2018 release.

The film premiered as the opening film of the 68th Berlin International Film Festival on February 15, 2018, and had its North American premiere as the closing film of the SXSW Film Festival in Austin, Texas, on March 17, 2018. Isle of Dogs began a limited release in the U.S. on March 23, 2018. It was released nationwide in the United States on April 13, 2018.

Box office

In its first weekend of limited release, the film made $1.57 million from 27 theaters (an average of $58,148 per venue). It was the best per-theater average of 2018 until it was overtaken by Eighth Grade in July. Sixty percent of its audience was under the age of 30. In its second weekend, the film made $2.8 million from 165 theaters (an increase of 74%), finishing 11th. The film entered the top 10 in its third weekend, making $4.6 million from 554 theaters. The film expanded to 1,939 theaters the following week and made $5.4 million, finishing seventh at the box office.

Home media
Isle of Dogs was released digitally on June 26, 2018, and on DVD and Blu-ray on July 17, 2018.

On streaming, Isle of Dogs was added on Disney+ in the US and Canada on January 15, 2021. It was added to the UK and Australian versions on 17 September 2021.

Reception

Critical response
The website's critical consensus reads, "The beautifully stop-motion animated Isle of Dogs finds Wes Anderson at his detail-oriented best while telling one of the director's most winsomely charming stories." On Metacritic, the film has a weighted average score of 82 out of 100, based on 55 critics, indicating "universal acclaim." Audiences polled by CinemaScore gave the film an average grade of "A" on an A+ to F scale, while PostTrak reported filmgoers gave it an overall positive score of 88%.

Richard Roeper of the Chicago Sun-Times gave the film three and a half stars out of four, praising it for taking risks, and saying: "It's smart and different and sometimes deliberately odd and really funny—rarely in a laugh-out-loud way, more in a smile-and-nod-I-get-the-joke kind of way."

Portrayal of Japanese culture
Some critics have argued that the film is an example of racial stereotyping and cultural appropriation, and that one of its characters aligns with the trope of the "white savior". The Japanese characters speak unsubtitled Japanese, with their dialogue instead being translated by an interpreter or a machine. Justin Chang of the Los Angeles Times wrote, "It's in the director's handling of the story's human factor that his sensitivity falters, and the weakness for racial stereotyping that has sometimes marred his work comes to the fore ... Much of the Japanese dialogue has been pared down to simple statements that non-speakers can figure out based on context and facial expressions". Angie Han, writing in Mashable, calls the American exchange student character Tracy a "classic example of the 'white savior' archetype—the well-meaning white hero who arrives in a foreign land and saves its people from themselves".

While this critique had created some furor on the film's release, Chang has said that his review had been taken out of context and turned into a "battle cry" on Twitter, adding, "I wasn't offended; nor was I looking to be offended". Another Japanese-American perspective was provided by Emily Yoshida, writing in New York magazine, that these concerns had been "seen before in debates about Asian culture as reflected by Western culture—perspectives can vary wildly between Asian-Americans and immigrated Asians, and what feels like tribute to some feels like opportunism to others".

Writing for BuzzFeed, Alison Willmore found "no overt malicious intent to Isle of Dogs cultural tourism, but it's marked by a hodgepodge of references that an American like Anderson might cough up if pressed to free associate about Japan—taiko drummers, anime, Hokusai, sumo, kabuki, haiku, cherry blossoms, and a mushroom cloud (!). ... This all has more to do with the ... insides of Anderson's brain than it does any actual place. It's Japan purely as an aesthetic—and another piece of art that treats the East not as a living, breathing half of the planet but as a mirror for the Western imagination". She continued, "in the wake of Isle of Dogs opening weekend, there were multiple headlines wondering whether the film was an act of appropriation or homage. But the question is rhetorical—the two aren't mutually exclusive, and the former is not automatically off the table just because the creator's intent was the latter".

Conversely, Moeko Fujii wrote a favorable review for The New Yorker, complimenting the film's depiction of the Japanese and their culture, as well as pointing out that language is the key theme of the movie. Fujii wrote,

Anderson's decision not to subtitle the Japanese speakers struck me as a carefully considered artistic choice. Isle of Dogs is profoundly interested in the humor and fallibility of translation ... This is the beating heart of the film: there is no such thing as "true" translation. Everything is interpreted. Translation is malleable and implicated, always, by systems of power ... [the film] shows the seams of translation, and demarcates a space that is accessible—and funny—only to Japanese viewers.

Fujii also deconstructed the criticisms of the character of Tracy Walker being a "white savior", and how this relates to the film's language theme, writing,

At a climactic moment, the movie rejects the notion of universal legibility, placing the onus of interpretation solely upon the American audience ... This is a sly subversion, in which the Japanese evince an agency independent of foreign validation. Indeed, to say that the scene dehumanizes the Japanese is to assume the primacy of an English-speaking audience. Such logic replicates the very tyranny of language that Isle of Dogs attempts to erode.

Accolades
Isle of Dogs received two Academy Awards, BAFTAs, and Golden Globe Award nominations for Best Animated Feature and Original Score, making it the first PG-13 rated animation to be nominated for these awards.

Notes

References

External links

 
 
 
 
 
 

2018 animated films
2018 films
2010s adventure comedy-drama films
2010s English-language films
2010s fantasy comedy-drama films
American adventure comedy-drama films
American animated fantasy films
American fantasy adventure films
American fantasy comedy-drama films
Animated adventure films
American animated comedy films
Animated drama films
Animated films about dogs
Animated films set in Japan
Animated films set in the future
Animated films directed by Wes Anderson
Anime-influenced Western animation
Annie Award winners
American dystopian films
English-language German films
Films about language
Films produced by Scott Rudin
Films produced by Wes Anderson
Films scored by Alexandre Desplat
Fox Searchlight Pictures films
20th Century Fox animated films
German animated fantasy films
German adventure comedy films
German fantasy adventure films
German fantasy comedy-drama films
Babelsberg Studio films
2010s Japanese-language films
Films with screenplays by Wes Anderson
Indian Paintbrush (production company) films
2010s stop-motion animated films
Films about viral outbreaks
Films set on fictional islands
2010s fantasy adventure films
American adult animated films
Japan in non-Japanese culture
2010s American films
2010s German films